CRST The Transportation Solution, Inc. (formerly CRST International) is an American freight company based in Cedar Rapids, Iowa.

Founded in 1955 by Herald and Miriam Smith, it is a privately held company with a current fleet of about 4,500 trucks and annual revenues of $1.5 billion.

History 
CRST was founded as "Cedar Rapids Steel Transport" in 1955 by Herald "Smitty" and Miriam Smith. They bought a chicken coop for $125 and with no trucks or customers, started their company. Herald saw his opportunity when he noticed truck drivers hauling livestock to Chicago and returning empty. He convinced Chicago firms he could save them money by loading those empty trucks with steel on their return to Cedar Rapids, hence the name of the company. Smith later purchased his own trucks, and expanded beyond the Chicago to Cedar Rapids route. By 1963, CRST had reached $1 million in revenue.

Herald's son, John Smith, took over as president in 1983. Under John's leadership, CRST began acquiring niche carriers. The most notable was the acquisition of Malone Freight Lines, Inc. out of Trussville, Alabama, which allowed CRST to expand its territory into the Southeast of the United States. In 1997, revenues were $300 million and John bought out the rest of his family's holdings in CRST.

In 2010, David Rusch became president and CEO of the company, with John moving on to become chairman of the board.

CRST entered a phase of mergers and acquisitions in the 2010s. It acquired Specialized Transportation Inc. out of Fort Wayne, Indiana in 2011. It later purchased the Special Products Division of Allied Van Lines in 2013. That same year, CRST acquired The Besl Transfer Co. of Cincinnati, Ohio, which specializes in flatbed transportation. In 2015, CRST purchased Pegasus Transportation which is a high security, temperature-controlled freight company out of Louisville, KY.

In 2014, CRST began building its company headquarters in Cedar Rapids, Iowa. In the same year, it began a program called "Gold Rules" to shift the corporate culture to focus on the drivers needs. Founder Herald Smith died in 2015.

Criticisms 
In 2011, the company lost a sexual harassment lawsuit in California's San Bernardino County Superior Court and was ordered to pay $1.5 million to the defendant, who stated she was sexually harassed by her managing driver. An appeal by the company was denied in 2015.

Another lawsuit, involving 67 plaintiffs who sued the company over sexual abuse and harassment beginning in 1999, began in 2007 and was lost for failing to meet pre-suit obligations. The lawsuit was re-filed with three plaintiffs in 2015. CRST took the case to the US Supreme Court to claim reimbursement of legal fees by the EEOC due to their failure to investigate many of the cases brought against CRST. The EEOC claimed they do not owe CRST these fees, however, following the Supreme Court's decision in CRST's favor, the matter was remanded to the Eighth Circuit Court of Appeals and back to the United States District Court for the Northern District of Iowa for further proceedings. In December 2017, the District Court ordered the EEOC to pay CRST $3.3 million in attorney fees. The EEOC appealed this order to the Eighth Circuit, which affirmed the fee award to CRST, paid by EEOC in 2020.

References

External links
Official website

Trucking companies of the United States
Privately held companies of the United States
Transport companies established in 1920
Privately held companies based in Iowa
1955 establishments in Iowa
Container shipping companies
Economy of the Southeastern United States
Economy of the Southwestern United States
Companies based in Cedar Rapids, Iowa
Transportation companies based in Iowa